Neighbors' Wives is a 1933 American pre-Code drama film directed by B. Reeves Eason and starring Dorothy Mackaill, Tom Moore and Mary Kornman.

Cast
 Dorothy Mackaill as Helen McGrath
 Tom Moore as John McGrath
 Mary Kornman as Mary McGrath
 Vivien Oakland as Ann Rainey
 Cyril Ring as Bill Cooper
 Emerson Treacy as Jeff Lee
 James Gordon as Judge Lee
 Mabel Van Buren as Mrs. Lee
 Paul Weigel as Otto

References

Bibliography
 Dooley, Roger. From Scarface to Scarlett: American Films in the 1930s. Harcourt Brace Jovanovich, 1984.

External links
 

1933 films
1933 drama films
American drama films
Films directed by B. Reeves Eason
American black-and-white films
1930s English-language films
1930s American films